"The Irish Keep Gate-crashing" is the third and final single from the album Let's Bottle Bohemia by Irish alternative rock band the Thrills. It was released on 21 March 2005 and reached number 48 on the UK Single Chart.

Track listings

Charts

References

The Thrills songs
2004 songs
2005 singles
Song recordings produced by Dave Sardy
Virgin Records singles